The  is a waste treatment plant located in Kami-ikebukuro, Toshima, Tokyo, Japan. It covers an area of 12,000 square meters and has two incineration units with a combined capacity of 400 tons of waste per day.

The plant was constructed with a large fitness center in order to appease area residents who may have otherwise opposed its construction. The center's swimming pool is heated from burning garbage while electricity is supplied from a steam-driven turbine. The plant outputs 7,800 kW of electricity, enough to supply 20,000 homes.

The plant's smokestack, at 210 meters in height, is the tallest industrial chimney in the special wards of Tokyo and was constructed in order for exhaust from the plant to clear the nearby 239-meter Sunshine 60 building.

References

Infrastructure completed in 1999
Waste in Japan
Ikebukuro
Towers in Japan
Buildings and structures in Toshima
Incinerators
1999 establishments in Japan